The 2015 Campeonato Paraibano de Futebol was the 105th edition of Paraíba's top professional football league. The competition ran from 18 January to 13 June. The champions, for the 19th time, were Campinense.

Format
The competition was divided into two stages.

In the first stage, the ten teams faced each other home and away for a total of 18 games. The top four teams qualified to the second stage. The bottom two teams were relegated to the second division.

In the second stage, the four qualifying teams faced each other home and away for a total of 6 games. The team winning the second stage was declared champion.

Qualification
The champions qualified to participate in the 2016 Copa do Brasil. The best placed team (other than Botafogo-PB) qualified to participate in the 2015 Campeonato Brasileiro Série D. The champions and vice champions qualified to participate in the 2016 Copa do Nordeste.

Participating teams

First stage

Standings

Second stage

Standings

References

Paraíba
2015